Kate Fitzgerald (born 3 July 1956) is a British television actress from Liverpool. She came to prominence playing Doreen Corkhill for five years in the soap opera Brookside (1985–1990), Nancy Tinker in Coronation Street (2015-2019), and Loretta Chase in Benidorm (2017–2018).

Education
Fitzgerald attended Notre Dame Catholic College girls' school in Liverpool, later graduating from drama school.

Career
Fitzgerald's first appearance on television was in 1979 on ITV Playhouse in the Willy Russell play The Daughters of Albion. Kate went on to star in Russell's Educating Rita at the Liverpool Playhouse in 1981, where she played Rita.

From 1985 to 1990, Kate played the character Doreen Corkhill in the Channel 4 soap opera Brookside. She appeared in Movies 'Til Dawn in 1997,  before moving on to ITV television series Peak Practice as Andrew Attwood's sister, Chrissy Booth, for four episodes. In 1999, she portrayed Mrs. Delaney for 2 episodes in Queer as Folk.

In 2004, she starred as Dorothy Potts in the film Under the Mud. In 2014, she played Vera in 2 episodes of Cilla. In 2015, she acheived a lifelong ambition when joining the cast of Coronation Street in a recurring role as Nancy Tinker for 13 episodes from 2015-2019.

In 2017, Fitzgerald starred as Loretta Chase in the ITV Sitcom Benidorm, the eccentric mother of Sheron Dawson (Julie Graham), remaining in the main cast for 17 episodes until 2018.

Filmography

Television

References

External links
  Agent- Kate Fitzgerald Profile
 

Living people
21st-century English actresses
Actresses from Liverpool
English stage actresses
English television actresses
English soap opera actresses
1956 births
20th-century English actresses